Villaricca (until May 13, 1871 called Panicocoli) is a comune (municipality) in the Metropolitan City of Naples in the Italian region Campania, located about 10 km northwest of Naples.

It is the birthplace of popular Italian singer Sergio Bruni and the venerable physician and priest Vittorio De Marino.

Geography
Villaricca borders the following municipalities: Calvizzano, Giugliano in Campania, Marano di Napoli, Mugnano di Napoli, Qualiano and Quarto.

References

External links

 Official website

Cities and towns in Campania